Horse Head may refer to:
 Horse Head, Virginia
 Horse Head (South Georgia), a rocky point on South Georgia
 Horse Head Island in Greenland
 Horse Head, an American musician who is a member of the collective GothBoiClique

See also
 Horsehead (disambiguation)
 Horse head mask
 Horse-head fiddle (disambiguation)